Laura Bettega (born 20 January 1968) is an Italian former cross-country skier. She competed in the women's 30 kilometre freestyle event at the 1992 Winter Olympics.

Cross-country skiing results
All results are sourced from the International Ski Federation (FIS).

Olympic Games

World Cup

Season standings

References

External links
 

1968 births
Living people
Italian female cross-country skiers
Olympic cross-country skiers of Italy
Cross-country skiers at the 1992 Winter Olympics
People from Feltre
Sportspeople from the Province of Belluno